Eric Holmes (born October 16, 1974) is an American professional stock car racing driver and three-time K&N Pro Series West champion.

Racing career

After running in local sanctioned NASCAR tracks with his father and finishing second in the NASCAR Southwest Tour, Holmes made his K&N Pro Series debut in 1997. In 2006, Holmes' first full year, he won his first career race at Thunderhill Raceway Park and had four poles and nine top fives en route to his first championship.

In 2007, Holmes won the event at Altamont Raceway Park. In 2008, he won at All-American Speedway, Colorado National Speedway, Thunderhill Raceway Park and Douglas County Speedway, winning his second championship along with five poles and nine top fives. During the 2009 season, he won at All-American Speedway, Madera Speedway and Douglas County Speedway and finishing in second in points.

For 2010, he got a record high 5 wins and clinched his third championship with victories at Phoenix International Raceway, his third straight at Douglas County Speedway, Montana Raceway Park, Colorado National Speedway, and his third win at All-American Speedway.

Motorsports career results

NASCAR
(key) (Bold – Pole position awarded by qualifying time. Italics – Pole position earned by points standings or practice time. * – Most laps led. ** – All laps led.)

K&N Pro Series East

K&N Pro Series West

References

External links

1974 births
Living people
NASCAR drivers
People from Escalon, California
Racing drivers from California